RDNA (Radeon DNA) is a graphics processing unit (GPU) microarchitecture and accompanying instruction set architecture developed by AMD. It is the successor to their Graphics Core Next (GCN) microarchitecture/instruction set. The first product lineup featuring RDNA was the Radeon RX 5000 series of video cards, launched on July 7, 2019. The architecture is also used in mobile products. It is manufactured and fabricated with TSMC's N7 FinFET graphics chips used in the Navi series of AMD Radeon graphics cards.

The second iteration of RDNA was first featured in the PlayStation 5 and Xbox Series X/S consoles. Both consoles utilize a custom RDNA 2-based graphics solution as the basis for their GPU microarchitecture. On PC, RDNA 2 is featured in the Radeon RX 6000 series of video cards, which first launched in November 2020. RDNA 2 is also featured in Samsung's Exynos 2200 as the graphics architecture.

The third iteration of RDNA was announced on November 3, 2022, and is set to be featured in the Radeon RX 7000 series of consumer desktop and mobile graphics cards.

RDNA 1 

RDNA 1 (also RDNA1) is the first implementation of the RDNA microarchitecture and is the successor to the Radeon RX Vega series. The launch occurred on July 7, 2019.

Architecture 

The architecture features a new processor design, although the first details released at AMD's Computex keynote hints at aspects from the previous Graphics Core Next (GCN) architecture being present for backwards compatibility purposes, which is especially important for its use (in the form of RDNA 2) in the major ninth generation game consoles (the Xbox Series X/S and PlayStation 5) to preserve native compatibility with their pre-existing eighth generation game libraries designed for GCN. It features multi-level cache hierarchy and an improved rendering pipeline, with support for GDDR6 memory.

Starting with the architecture itself, one of the biggest changes for RDNA is the width of a wavefront, the fundamental group of work. GCN in all of its iterations was 64 threads wide, meaning 64 threads were bundled together into a single wavefront for execution. RDNA drops this to a native 32 threads wide. At the same time, AMD has expanded the width of their SIMDs from 16 slots to 32 (aka SIMD32), meaning the size of a wavefront now matches the SIMD size.

RDNA also introduces working primitive shaders. While the feature was present in the hardware of the Vega architecture, it was difficult to get a real-world performance boost from and thus AMD never enabled it. Primitive shaders in RDNA are compiler-controlled.

The display controller in RDNA has been updated to support Display Stream Compression 1.2a, allowing output in 4K@240 Hz, HDR 4K@120 Hz, and HDR 8K@60 Hz.

Instruction set 

AMD's GPUOpen website hosts a PDF document aiming to describe the environment, the organization and the program state of RDNA devices. It details the instruction set and the microcode formats native to this family of processors that are accessible to programmers and compilers.

Differences between GCN and RDNA 
There are architectural changes which affect how code is scheduled:

Single cycle instruction issue:
GCN issued one instruction per wave once every 4 cycles.
RDNA issues instructions every cycle.
Wave32:
GCN used a wavefront size of 64 threads (work items).
RDNA supports both wavefront sizes of 32 and 64 threads.
Workgroup Processors:
GCN grouped the shader hardware into "compute units" (CUs) which contained scalar ALUs and vector ALUs, LDS and memory access. One CU contains 4 SIMD16s which share one path to memory.
RDNA introduced the "workgroup processor" ("WGP"). The WGP replaces the compute unit as the basic unit of shader computation hardware/computing. One WGP encompasses 2 CUs. This allows significantly more compute power and memory bandwidth to be directed at a single workgroup. In RDNA, 1 CU is one half of a WGP.

Chips 
discrete GPUs:
 Navi 10 found on Radeon RX 5600, Radeon RX 5600 XT, Radeon RX 5600M, Radeon RX 5700, Radeon RX 5700M, Radeon RX 5700 XT, Radeon Pro 5700, Radeon Pro 5700 XT, Radeon Pro W5700X, and Radeon Pro W5700 graphics cards
 Navi 12 found on Radeon Pro V520 branded graphics card, Radeon Pro 5600M branded mobile graphics card and BC-160 mining card for cryptocurrency
 Navi 14 found on Radeon RX 5300, Radeon RX 5300 XT, Radeon Pro 5300,  Radeon Pro W5300, Radeon RX 5500, Radeon RX 5500 XT, Radeon Pro 5500, Radeon Pro 5500 XT, and Radeon Pro W5500, branded graphics cards; Radeon RX 5300M, Radeon Pro 5300M, Radeon Pro W5300M, Radeon RX 5500M, Radeon Pro 5500M, and Radeon Pro W5500M branded mobile graphics cards

RDNA 2 

RDNA 2 (also RDNA2) is the successor to the RDNA microarchitecture. It was first publicly announced in early 2020 with a projected release in Q4 2020. According to statements from AMD, RDNA 2 would be a "refresh" of the RDNA architecture.

More information about RDNA 2 was made public on AMD's Financial Analyst Day on March 5, 2020. AMD claimed that it would provide a 50% performance-per-watt improvement over RDNA, with increases in clock speed and instructions-per-clock. Additional features confirmed by AMD include real-time, hardware accelerated ray tracing, "Infinity Cache", mesh shaders, sampler feedback and variable rate shading. The company announced that RDNA 2 would be used in next-generation gaming consoles and PC graphics cards code-named "Navi 2X" and also nicknamed as "Big Navi".

AMD unveiled the Radeon RX 6000 series, its next-gen RDNA 2 graphics cards at an online event on October 28, 2020. The lineup initially consisted of the RX 6800, RX 6800 XT and RX 6900 XT. The RX 6800 and 6800 XT launched on November 18, 2020, with the RX 6900 XT being released on December 8, 2020. Further variants including a Radeon RX 6700 (XT) series based on Navi 22, later launched on March 18, 2021.

On May 31, 2021, AMD launched the RX 6000M series of GPUs designed for laptops. These include the RX 6600M, RX 6700M, and RX 6800M. These were made available beginning on June 1, 2021.

On June 1, 2021, AMD's CEO Dr. Lisa Su and Tesla, Inc.'s CEO Elon Musk confirmed that the entertainment systems of Tesla's new Model S and Model X are powered by RDNA 2. The same microarchitecture was also announced to be used for an upcoming flagship Samsung Exynos SoC, later introduced in January 2022 as Exynos 2200, utilizing a custom Xclipse 920 GPU with 3 compute units.

An RDNA 2 integrated GPU with 2 compute units is included in the I/O die on AMD's Zen 4-based Ryzen 7000 Series CPUs. According to AMD, the integrated RDNA 2 graphics in Ryzen 7000 are not intended for gaming and is instead intended for diagnostic purposes and offering video encode and decode capabilities.

Chips 
discrete GPUs:
 Navi 21
 Navi 22
 Navi 23
 Navi 24

integrated into APUs/CPUs:
 Rembrandt (as "Radeon 660M" and "Radeon 680M" models found on Ryzen 6000 series mobile APUs)
 Raphael (as "Radeon Graphics" branded iGPU found on Ryzen 7000 series CPUs)
 Mendocino (as "Radeon 610M" model found on Ryzen 7020 series mobile APUs)
 Rembrandt R (as "Radeon 660M" and "Radeon 680M" models found on Ryzen 7035 series mobile APUs))
 Dragon Range (as "Radeon 610M" model found on Ryzen 7045 series mobile APUs)

Usage in video game consoles 
Custom configurations of the RDNA 2 graphics microarchitecture are used in the PlayStation 5 from Sony, Xbox Series X and Series S consoles from Microsoft, with proprietary tweaks and different GPU modifications in each system's implementation.
Valve announced on July 15, 2021 that their Steam Deck would feature the RDNA 2 architecture. The Steam Deck was released in February 2022.

RDNA 3 

RDNA 3 (also RDNA3) is the successor to the RDNA 2 microarchitecture and was projected for a launch in Q4 2022 per AMD's gaming GPU roadmap. At an August 29 reveal event for Ryzen 7000 series CPUs, AMD CEO Lisa Su teased RDNA 3 and revealed that it would utilize chiplets built on TSMC's N5 node. On September 19, 2022, Sam Naffziger, the current senior vice president at AMD, stated in a blogpost that improvements made to the RDNA 3 microarchitecture allow for considerable performance gains and efficiency, with an estimated 50% increase in performance-per-watt compared to the RDNA 2 microarchitecture. Additionally, the RDNA 3 architecture features the next generation of Infinity Cache, a modified graphics pipeline, adaptive power management and rearchitected compute units, leading to an overall robust uplift in rasterization and ray-tracing performance over the previous consumer architecture.

On November 3, 2022, AMD unveiled the RX 7900 XTX and RX 7900 XT graphics cards, based on the RDNA 3 microarchitecture. These are the first commercial GPUs to be based on multi-chip module (MCM) design.

Chips 
discrete GPUs:
 Navi 31 found on Radeon RX 7900 XT and Radeon RX 7900 XTX branded graphics cards
 Navi 33 found on Radeon RX 7600S, Radeon RX 7600M, Radeon RX 7600M XT and Radeon RX 7700S branded mobile graphics cards

integrated into APUs/CPUs:
 Phoenix (as "Radeon 760M" and "Radeon 780M" models found on Ryzen 7040 series mobile APUs)

Comparison of RDNA chips

See also 
 List of AMD graphics processing units
 AMD Radeon Software
 GPUOpen
 ROCm

References

External links 
 RDNA's official page on AMD.com
 AMD RDNA 1.0 Instruction Set Architecture – Reference Guide - developer.amd.com
 AMD RDNA 2 Instruction Set Architecture – Reference Guide - developer.amd.com
 AMD RDNA3 Instruction Set Architecture – Reference Guide - developer.amd.com

AMD microarchitectures
Computer-related introductions in 2019
Graphics microarchitectures